Crimes of Fashion is a 2004 American crime comedy television film directed by Stuart Gillard. The film stars Kaley Cuoco, Dominic Chianese, and Megan Fox, and premiered on ABC Family on July 25, 2004.

Premise
Brooke, a plain but creative and hard-working student at the top fashion school in the nation,  has come a long way from her tough childhood in foster care. Always dreaming of a career in fashion, she is thrilled to finally be on her way. However, when the grandfather she never knew about dies, her life is suddenly turned upside down. Not only has he left her his estate, he  left her in charge of the family business; she is to be the boss of a mob that is trying to become legit. If that is not enough, the handsome new student she is falling for may be trying to bring her family down.

Cast
 Kaley Cuoco as Brooke Sarto
 Megan Fox as Candace, a fashion designer rival of Brooke's
 Chuck Shamata as Sal Hugo, an enemy mob boss, who is trying to take over the Sarto's territory
 David Sparrow as Bruno, Sal Hugo's bodyguard
 Pat Kelly as Jack Lawton, an FBI agent, who goes undercover
 Dominic Chianese as George, the person who contacts Brooke and helps her become the new mob boss. He has a big secret.
 Tim Rozon as Marcus, a handsome man on whom Brooke has a crush in the earlier part of the film
 James Kall as bartender

References

External links
 
 

2004 television films
2004 comedy films
2004 films
2000s American films
2000s crime comedy films
2000s English-language films
ABC Family original films
American comedy television films
American crime comedy films
Crime television films
Films about fashion in the United States
Films directed by Stuart Gillard
Films scored by Michael Wandmacher
Mafia comedy films